Çiftlik (literally "farm" in Turkish) may refer to:

Chiflik, the non-Turkish spelling of an Ottoman system of land management
 Çiftlik, Emirdağ, a village in the district of Emirdağ, Afyonkarahisar Province, Turkey
 Çiftlik, Gölpazarı, a village in the district of Gölpazarı, Bilecik Province, Turkey
 Çiftlik, Horasan
 Çiftlik, Marmaris, a village in the district of Marmaris, Muğla Province, Turkey
 Çiftlik, Niğde,  a town and district of Niğde Province, Turkey
 Çiftlik, Osmaneli, a village in the district of Osmaneli, Bilecik Province, Turkey
 Çiftlik, Şavşat, a village in the district of Şavşat, Artvin Province, Turkey
 Çiftlik, Tarsus, a village in district of Tarsus, Mersin Province, Turkey
 Çiftlik, Taşköprü, a village
 Çiftlik, Tut, a village in the district of Tut, Adıyaman Province, Turkey
 Çiftlik, Yenice